Skywards is an album by guitarist Terje Rypdal recorded in 1996 and released on the ECM label.

Reception
The Allmusic review by Thom Jurek awarded the album 3 stars stating "Skywards is Rypdal's most openly schizophrenic yet satisfyingly ambitious work in many years".

Track listing
All compositions by Terje Rypdal
 "Skywards" - 4:03 
 "Into the Wilderness" - 7:35 
 "It's Not over Until the Fat Lady Sings!" - 4:29 
 "The Pleasure Is Mine, I'm Sure" - 3:12 
 "Out of This World (Sinfonietta)" - 16:01 
 "Shining" - 5:42 
 "Remember to Remember" - 8:44

Personnel
Terje Rypdal — electric guitar
Palle Mikkelborg — trumpet
Terje Tønnesen — violin
David Darling — cello
Christian Eggen — piano, keyboards
Paolo Vinaccia — drums, percussion
Jon Christensen — drums

References

ECM Records albums
Terje Rypdal albums
1997 albums
Albums produced by Manfred Eicher